Que te Quería (Spanish for "That I Loved You") is La 5ª Estación's first single released from their fourth studio album, Sin Frenos.

Song information
This was La Quinta Estacion's first single as a duo.

Angel Reyero, composer and band member, comments:
"Es la canción que abre el disco y es muy distinta, más rockera a lo que habíamos hecho hasta ahora y habla de una relación pasada de alguien que intenta apegarse a algo que ya no es"

(Translation) "It's the song that opens the disc and it's very different, it's more rock than any other we have done to this point and it talks about a past relationship of someone who tries to cling on to something that is no longer there."

Music video
Jorge Abarca, directed the music video of Que te Quería using a special camera called Phantom, a type of special equipment to record high quality images. This helped the special effects to be more focused and better seen. The music video does not have a story, but includes lots effects such as rain and real flames. Natalia and Angel were supervised, but where very close to the flames. Natalia's dress kept undoing and her hair puff up. The dress Natalia was wearing was not an actual dress, but was made quickly using a red fabric. The video is very dark and moody representing the "world" one feels when broken up in a relationship. The video took 20 hours to complete and premiered exclusively to Ritmoson on Jan. 21, 2009.

Charts

Sales and certifications

See also
List of number-one songs of 2009 (Mexico)

References

La 5ª Estación songs
2009 singles
Monitor Latino Top General number-one singles
Songs written by Angel Reyero
Songs written by Armando Ávila
Song recordings produced by Armando Ávila
2009 songs